Paul J. Lunardi (September 30, 1921 - January 11, 2013) was an American politician.

Early life 
On September 30, 1921, Lunardi was born in Roseville, California. He served in the United States Coast Guard during World War II. Lunardi graduated from Roseville High School.

Career 
In 1950, Lunardi's career began as a city council member of Roseville, California. He was a Democrat.
Lunardi was elected as the mayor of his hometown of Roseville in 1954. He served as a member of the California State Assembly from 1959 to 1963 and a State Senator from 1963 to 1967. Under his tenure, he designated the ghost town of Bodie, California as a State Historic Park.

Personal life 
In 1948, Lunardi married Geraldine F. Shirley. Lunardi has three children, Herman, Yvonne and Nancy.

On January 11, 2013, Lunardi died.

References

External links 
 Hwy 267 at sierrasun.com
 Join California Paul J. Lundari

1921 births
2013 deaths
People from Roseville, California
Military personnel from California
California city council members
Democratic Party members of the California State Assembly
Mayors of places in California
Democratic Party California state senators
20th-century American politicians
United States Coast Guard personnel of World War II